Sabaot (Sebei) is a Kalenjin language of Kenya. The Sabaot people live around Mount Elgon in both Kenya and Uganda. The hills of their homeland gradually rise from an elevation of 5,000 to 14,000 feet. The Kenya–Uganda border goes straight through the mountain-top, cutting the Sabaot homeland into two halves.

Grammar
Typical of Nilotic languages, Sabaot uses advanced tongue root (ATR) to express some morphological operations:

References
Sabaot SIDO Website:

Kalenjin languages